The East Timor national badminton team represents East Timor in international badminton competitions. After East Timor's independence from Indonesia in 2002, the Badminton Federation of East Timor was found and the national team was later formed. The national association soon started sending out athletes to compete in international tournaments.

While badminton is not a popular sport in East Timor, the nation has competed in tournaments such as the Asian Games and the BWF World Junior Championships. East Timor has also made its presence in para-badminton. National para-badminton player, Anibal Gusmao Pereira was the first Timorese para-badminton player to play in the Asian Games.

According to Pereira, badminton is highly unrecognized in East Timor and locals enjoy football more than badminton.

Participation in BWF competitions

BWF World Junior Championships 
Individual event

Participation in Asian Games

Individual event

Current squad 

Male players
Manuel Ananias Sarmento
Celestino Maria Dos Anjos
Raymond Sing
Afonso Francisco

Female players
Veronica do Carmo

References 

Badminton
National badminton teams